Pogonopsis is a genus of ground beetles in the family Carabidae. This genus has a single species, Pogonopsis pallida. It is found in Tunisia.

References

Trechinae